The , in short:  (English: Teubner Foundation), was founded on 21 February 2003 in the  (English: House of the Book) at Gutenbergplatz, Leipzig.

Purpose 
The Teubner foundation aims to keep the memory of the work of the Saxon company founder, publisher, bookseller, book printer, typographer and Leipzig city councilor Benedictus Gotthelf Teubner alive in the public.

The purpose of the foundation is to promote science and research in the sense of B.G. Teubner.

Awards
The winners so far are:

 2004: Albrecht Beutelspacher (Mathematics Gießen)
 2005: Leipziger Schülergesellschaft für Mathematik (LSGM) (English: Leipzig Student Society for Mathematics)
 2009: Mathematische Schülergesellschaft (MSG) (English: Mathematical Student Society) "Leonhard Euler" at the Humboldt University Berlin
 2010: Erlebnisland Mathematik (English: Adventureland Mathematics) (joined project of the Department of Mathematics / TU Dresden with the Technische Sammlungen Dresden)
 2011: Adam-Ries-Bund Annaberg-Buchholz
 2012: Mathematical journal  in Jena
 2015: Urania Berlin e.V.
 2018: Gauss-Gesellschaft e.V. Göttingen

The celebration was held during the annual conference of the Teubner Foundation on 21 February 2011 in the Leibniz lecture hall of the Max Planck Institute for Mathematics in the Natural Sciences in Leipzig.

Winners:
 2014: Eberhard Zeidler (Leipzig)
 2016:  (1936–2015), posthumously
 2018: Jürgen Jost (Leipzig)
 2020: Gerhard Huisken (Tübingen / Oberwolfach)

References

Further reading

External links 
 Stiftung Benedictus Gotthelf Teubner Leipzig / Dresden / Berlin / Stuttgart
 Another website of the foundation

Scientific research foundations
2003 establishments in Germany
Organisations based in Leipzig